Punnami Naagu is an Indian Telugu-language horror drama film directed by Rajasekhar and produced by AVM Productions. The film brought recognition to Chiranjeevi and his first Filmfare nomination. The other leads in the film, including Rati Agnihotri, Narasimha Raju and Padmanabham played important roles. The film was released on 13 June 1980. It is a remake of the director's own Kannada film Hunnimeya Rathriyalli. It also marked the Telugu debut for Malayalam actress, Menaka G. Suresh.

Plot 
Naagulu (Chiranjeevi), a snake charmer, falls in love with Menaka, whose adopted brother Raju (Narasimha Raju) is in love with Naagulu's cousin Laxmi (Rati Agnihotri). Naagulu's father has been mixing snake venom into his food since childhood, making Naagulu immune to any snake bite. Every full moon, Naagulu behaves like a cobra and searches for a woman and every woman he meets dies from his poison. On one such full moon, he kills Menaka and Raju gets suspicious about this, as there are no marks of a snake bite on her body. A young teacher comes to the village and becomes Naagulu's victim. Raju investigates with the help of film in her still camera and discovers that Naagulu has become a snake. Naagulu's father reveals his secret before dying and Naagulu tries to find a remedy, but it's too late for that. His skin starts peeling off like a snake and Raju advises him to leave the village before villagers find and kill him. Naagulu prefers death to the life of a snake and commits suicide from a hilltop.

Cast 
 Chiranjeevi as Naagulu
 Narasimha Raju as Raju
 Rati Agnihotri as Lakshmi
 Menaka as poornima
 Jayamalini
 Sumangali
 Padmanabham
 Mikkilineni
 Dhulipala
Balakrishna
Ramadas

References

External links 
 

1980 films
1980s Telugu-language films
Films scored by K. Chakravarthy
Telugu remakes of Kannada films
Films about snakes
Films about shapeshifting
Films directed by Rajasekhar (director)